is a Japanese actor, headed by BMI Inc. Watanabe is best known for his role as Kunimitsu Tezuka of the fourth generation Seigaku cast in The Prince of Tennis musical series, Tenimyu. In 2016 he made his first appearance on the boards of the Imperial Theatre in musical 1789 - Bastille no Koibitotachi.

He married actress Ami Norimatsu in 2020.

TV 
Ultraman Mebius (2006) as George Ikaruga
Danshiing!!(男子ing!!)(2012.9.14 TOKYO MX)
NHK Umai (2010–present)

Movie 
Ultraman Mebius & Ultraman Brothers (2006) as George Ikaruga
Takumi-kun Series 2: Nijiiro no Garasu (2009) as Saki Giichi
Takumi-kun Series 3: Bibou no Detail (2010) as Saki Giichi
Takumi-kun Series 4: Pure (2010) as Saki Giichi
Battle of Demons (2010) as Mitsuaki Shizuma
Gachinko kenka joto (2010) as Jiro
Takumi-kun Series 5: Ano, Hareta Aozora (2011) as Saki Giichi
Fumoukaigi (2013)
Bokutachi No Kougen Hotel (2013) as Ryuuya Sawashiro
Magic Knight (2014)
Kabadieen! Gekitotsu Dokuro Koko hen (2014) as Atsushi Fushimi

Stage 
 The Prince of Tennis Musical Series (Tenimyu) as Kunimitsu Tezuka
The Prince of Tennis Musical: The Progressive Match Higa Chuu feat Rikkai (In Winter of 2007-2008)
The Prince of Tennis Musical: Dream Live 5th (2008)
The Prince of Tennis Musical: The Imperial Presence Hyotei Gakuen feat. Higa Chuu (2008)
The Prince of Tennis Musical: The Treasure Match Shitenhouji feat Hyotei Gakuen (2008-2009)
The Prince of Tennis Musical: Dream Live 6th (2009)
SAKURA (2009)
Rock'n Jam Musical (2009)
BUTLER×BATTLER (2010)
Jinsei wa Showtime (2010)
Miracle Train (2010, 2012)
Cantarella Musical (2011) as Giovanni
The Prince of a Wonderful Town (2012) as Ichijou Ran
The Prince of a Wonderful Town - Chapter 2 (2013)
Fumoukaigi (2013)
Dracula (2013) as Jack Seward
LIVING ADV「STEINS;GATE」 (2013) as Okabe Rintarou
CLUB SLAZY The 2nd invitation～Sapphire～ (2013) as King
Musical - Uchoten Kazoku (The Eccentric Family): Atelier Duncan (2014)
Blood Brothers (2015)
South Pacific (2015, 2016)
Honganji (2016)
1789 - Bastille no Koibitotachi (2016) as Camille Desmoulins
Musical Biohazard ~Voice of Gaia~ (2016) as Dan Gibson
Romeo & Juliette (2017) as Tybalt

DVD 
 Men's DVD "With the Wind" (released August 29, 2008)
 Acedeuce - Watanabe Daisuke "Search for my roots" (2009)
 Real Faces - Watanabe Daisuke (2015)
 SLF - Watanabe Daisuke "Third Photobook 'ROAD' - Making DVD"

CD 
 Musical Prince of Tennis The Best Actors Series 011 - Watanabe Daisuke as Tezuka Kunimitsu (released July 30, 2008)
 1789 - Bastille no Koibitotachi - Version d'égalité (2016)
 1789 - Bastille no Koibitotachi - Version de liberté (2016)

Photobook 
 Men's Photobook "Prologue" (released September 17, 2008)
 Day & Night - Watanabe Daisuke in Vietnam (released January 2013)
 Watanabe Daisuke - Third Photobook "ROAD" (released February 2016)

Commercials 
 2006 "Japan Airlines Hawaii 2006 SPORTS × SMILE
 November 2011: LION "GUEST & ME"
 "March 2012 LION "GUEST & ME"
 June 2012 LION "SmileCosmetique"
 April 2014 Zelia Health Way "inner cosmetic 5000"

References

External links
Watanabe Daisuke's blog
Official fan club
Official Takumi-kun website
Official Prince of Tennis musicals website

1982 births
Living people
Male actors from Kanagawa Prefecture
21st-century Japanese male actors
Aikawa, Kanagawa